Dhan Daulat is a 1980 Indian Bollywood film directed by Harish Shah and produced by Vinod Shah. It stars Rishi Kapoor and Neetu Singh in pivotal roles.

Cast

Rajendra Kumar ... Raj Saxena
Mala Sinha ... Vasudha Saxena 
Rishi Kapoor ... Lucky Saxena 
Neetu Singh ... Shanti
Prem Chopra ... Sujit Chopra 
Premnath ... Mangat
Pran ... Bajirao
Sujit Kumar ... Sudhir Verma
Madan Puri ... Shanti's Father
Kader Khan ... Laajo's Brother
Agha ... Rahim Miyan 
Vikas Anand ... Police Inspector 
Preeti Ganguli ... Laajo 
Jagdish Raj... Police Inspector
Avtaar Gill
Azaad Irani ... Sudhir's Friend

Soundtrack
The music for the film was by R. D. Burman while the lyrics were written by Majrooh Sultanpuri.

References

External links
 
 
 

1980s Hindi-language films
1980 films
Films scored by R. D. Burman